Pyrausta nigrata is a species of moth of the family Crambidae. It was described by Giovanni Antonio Scopoli in his 1763 Entomologia Carniolica and it is found in Europe.

The moth flies from June to October depending on the location.

The larvae feed on various herbs, such as thyme and marjoram.

External links
 Pyrausta nigrata at UKMoths

nigrata
Moths described in 1763
Moths of Europe
Taxa named by Giovanni Antonio Scopoli